Warmsworth is a civil parish in the metropolitan borough of Doncaster, South Yorkshire, England.  The parish contains eight listed buildings that are recorded in the National Heritage List for England.  Of these, one is listed at Grade II*, the middle of the three grades, and the others are at Grade II, the lowest grade.  The parish contains the village of Warmsworth and the surrounding countryside.  The most important building in the parish is Warmsworth Hall, which is listed, together with associated structures,  The other listed buildings are a bell tower, a former Quaker meeting house, a barn, a pair of houses, and a bridge.


Key

Buildings

References

Citations

Sources

 

Lists of listed buildings in South Yorkshire
Buildings and structures in the Metropolitan Borough of Doncaster